The Family Honor is a 1917 American silent drama film directed by Emile Chautard and starring Robert Warwick, June Elvidge and Henry Hull.

Cast
 Robert Warwick as Captain Stephen Wayne 
 June Elvidge as Marcia Quesnay 
 Alec B. Francis as General Jason Wayne 
 Henry Hull as Anthony Wayne 
 Gerda Holmes as Doris Leighton 
 Frank Beamish as Eric Mainwaring

References

Bibliography
 Larry Langman. Destination Hollywood: The Influence of Europeans on American Filmmaking. McFarland, 2000.

External links
 

1917 films
1917 drama films
1910s English-language films
American silent feature films
Silent American drama films
Films directed by Emile Chautard
American black-and-white films
World Film Company films
Films shot in Fort Lee, New Jersey
1910s American films